The 1959 All-Ireland Senior Football Championship was the 73rd staging of Ireland's premier Gaelic football knock-out competition.

In the All Ireland semi-final Kerry ended Dublin period as All Ireland champions that won in 1958.

Kerry were the winners.

Results

Connacht Senior Football Championship

Leinster Senior Football Championship

Munster Senior Football Championship

Ulster Senior Football Championship

All-Ireland Senior Football Championship

Championship statistics

Miscellaneous

 Leitrim record their first ever win over Mayo after a replay.
 Both Ulster semi-finals ended in a draw and went to a replay.
 Down win the Ulster title for the first time.
 The All Ireland semi-final between Galway and Down was their first championship meeting between them.

References

All-Ireland Senior Football Championship